Kyle Hartigan (born 7 November 1991) is a professional Australian rules football player who plays for the Hawthorn Football Club in the Australian Football League (AFL), having previously played for . Hartigan was selected with the Crows' first pick, number 14 overall, in the 2012 Rookie Draft.

Pre-AFL career
Overlooked in the 2009 national and rookie drafts as an 18-year-old, Hartigan was the subject of a tug-of-war between VFL teams Werribee and Williamstown; zoned to Williamstown, Hartigan wished to play for Werribee instead, to improve his chances of playing senior football and catching the eye of AFL recruiters looking for a mature prospect. Eventually the deal was done and Hartigan started playing for Werribee. Finally, after three years playing for Werribee, Hartigan was drafted by Adelaide in the 2012 rookie draft.

AFL career
Strong performances for SANFL club  saw Hartigan promoted to the Crows senior list during his first season, as cover for injured defender Brent Reilly. Hartigan subsequently made his AFL debut against  in round 18, and went on to play three matches as a key defender, looking comfortable at AFL level. He played seven matches in 2014 before being dropped, and was in good form in the SANFL before suffering serious internal injuries in a collision with teammate Ben Rutten, which ruled him out for the rest of the season.

In 2015, Hartigan established himself in Adelaide's young backline with 18 matches, during which he stood some of the most dangerous key forwards in the AFL. At the end of the season he signed a two-year deal with Adelaide.

Following the conclusion of the 2016 season, Hartigan has been linked to Carlton Football Club as part of the Bryce Gibbs trade. Despite denials from Adelaide and his management, images emerged on social media of Hartigan meeting with Steven Trigg and his manager in South Yarra on 17 October 2016.

At the end of the 2016 season Hartigan was the only player on the Crows’ list not contracted beyond the 2017 season, but during the season he signed a new three-year deal. In a Showdown in Round 3, Hartigan surprisingly tagged Robbie Gray, who is both significantly shorter and significantly lighter than Hartigan. In spite of the apparent mismatch, Hartigan kept Gray to just two goals, less than the six goals that Gray had kicked the week before against .

In the second half of the season Hartigan suffered from injury problems, keeping him out of the side for over a month. He initially injured his hamstring in a match against  at the MCG on 1 July, which was expected to keep him sidelined for six weeks, but he was able to return through the SANFL within a month. On 30 July he played a game for Adelaide’s reserves team in Bordertown, and again injured his hamstring. He went on to play in the 2017 AFL Grand Final, which the Crows lost to premiers  by 48 points.

On November 5 2020, Hartigan was traded to  during the AFL 2020 trade period in exchange for a future fourth-round pick.

Following the end of the 2022 season, Hartigan was delisted by Hawthorn.

Statistics
Updated to the end of the 2022 season.

|-
| 2013 ||  || 41
| 3 || 0 || 0 || 27 || 29 || 56 || 22 || 2 || 0.0 || 0.0 || 9.0 || 9.7 || 18.7 || 7.3 || 0.7 || 0
|-
| 2014 ||  || 41
| 7 || 0 || 0 || 56 || 50 || 106 || 41 || 9 || 0.0 || 0.0 || 8.0 || 7.1 || 15.1 || 5.9 || 1.3 || 0
|-
| 2015 ||  || 15
| 18 || 0 || 0 || 92 || 87 || 179 || 66 || 19 || 0.0 || 0.0 || 5.1 || 4.8 || 9.9 || 3.7 || 1.1 || 0
|-
| 2016 ||  || 15
| 23 || 1 || 0 || 172 || 128 || 300 || 116 || 39 || 0.0 || 0.0 || 7.5 || 5.6 || 13.0 || 5.0 || 1.7 || 0
|-
| 2017 ||  || 15
| 18 || 0 || 0 || 128 || 85 || 213 || 78 || 30 || 0.0 || 0.0 || 7.1 || 4.7 || 11.8 || 4.3 || 1.7 || 0
|-
| 2018 ||  || 15
| 13 || 0 || 0 || 96 || 53 || 149 || 69 || 14 || 0.0 || 0.0 || 7.4 || 4.1 || 11.5 || 5.3 || 1.1 || 0
|-
| 2019 ||  || 15
| 19 || 0 || 0 || 119 || 76 || 195 || 79 || 18 || 0.0 || 0.0 || 6.3 || 4.0 || 10.3 || 4.1 || 1.0 || 0
|-
| 2020 || |  || 15
| 12 || 0 || 0 || 68 || 43 || 111 || 37 || 18 || 0.0 || 0.0 || 5.7 || 3.6 || 9.3 || 3.1 || 1.5 || 0
|-
| 2021 ||  || 28
| 19 || 0 || 0 || 106 || 95 || 201 || 66 || 16 || 0.0 || 0.0 || 5.6 || 5.0 || 10.6 || 3.5 || 0.8 || 0
|-
| 2022 ||  || 28
| 3 || 0 || 0 || 8 || 5 || 13 || 5 || 2 || 0.0 || 0.0 || 2.7 || 1.7 || 4.3 || 1.7 || 0.7 || 0
|- class="sortbottom"
! colspan=3| Career
! 135 !! 1 !! 0 !! 872 !! 652 !! 1524 !! 579 !! 167 !! 0.0 !! 0.0 !! 6.5 !! 4.8 !! 11.3 !! 4.3 !! 1.2 !! 0
|}

Notes

Honours and achievements
Team
 Minor premiership: 2017

References

External links

Adelaide Football Club players
South Adelaide Football Club players
1991 births
Living people
Australian rules footballers from Victoria (Australia)
Werribee Football Club players
Adelaide Football Club (SANFL) players
Hawthorn Football Club players
Box Hill Football Club players